The 6th Aerobic Gymnastics World Championships were held in Riesa, Germany from 2 to 4 June 2000.

Results

Women's Individual

Men's Individual

Mixed Pair

Trio

Medal table

References
FIG official site
UEG European Union of Gymnastics Statistics

Aerobic Gymnastics Championships
Aerobic Gymnastics World Championships
Aerobic Gymnastics World Championships
Aerobic Gymnastics World Championships
International gymnastics competitions hosted by Germany